Holmesville is the name of several places:

In Australia
Holmesville, New South Wales

In the United States
Holmesville, Georgia
Holmesville, Indiana
Holmesville, Mississippi
Holmesville, Nebraska
Holmesville, New York
Holmesville, Ohio
Holmesville Township, Minnesota